Tetraopes melanurus is a species of beetle in the family Cerambycidae. It was described by Schoenherr in 1817. It is known from the United States.

References

Tetraopini
Beetles described in 1817